Eleni Xenaki (born 5 July 1997) is a female water polo player of Greece. She was part of the Greek team that won the silver medal at the 2018 European Championship in Barcelona and the sixth place at the 2015 World Aquatics Championships. At club level, she plays for Olympiacos.

See also
 Greece at the 2015 World Aquatics Championships

References

Greek female water polo players
Competitors at the 2018 Mediterranean Games
Mediterranean Games bronze medalists for Greece
Mediterranean Games medalists in water polo
Olympiacos Women's Water Polo Team players
Living people
Place of birth missing (living people)
1997 births
21st-century Greek women